The 1971 US Open was a tennis tournament that took place on the outdoor grass courts at the West Side Tennis Club in Forest Hills, Queens, in New York City, USA. The tournament ran from 1 September until 12 September. It was the 91st staging of the US Open, and the fourth Grand Slam tennis event of 1971.

Finals

Men's singles

 Stan Smith defeated  Jan Kodeš, 3–6, 6–3, 6–2, 7–6(5–3)  
• It was Smith's 1st career Grand Slam singles title and his 1st and only at the US Open.

Women's singles

 Billie Jean King defeated  Rosemary Casals, 6–4, 7–6 
• It was King's 6th career Grand Slam singles title, her 2nd during the Open Era and her 2nd at the US Open.

Men's doubles

 John Newcombe /  Roger Taylor defeated  Stan Smith /  Erik van Dillen, 6–7, 6–3, 7–6, 4–6, [5-3] 
• It was Newcombe's 12th career Grand Slam doubles title, his 6th during the Open Era and his 2nd US Open and 1st of the open era. 
• It was Taylor's 1st career Grand Slam doubles title.

Women's doubles

 Rosemary Casals /  Judy Tegart Dalton defeated  Gail Chanfreau /  Françoise Dürr, 6–3, 6–3 
• It was Casals' 6th career Grand Slam doubles title, her 4th during the Open Era and her 2nd at the US Open.
• It was Tegart Dalton's 8th and last career Grand Slam doubles title, her 5th during the Open Era and her 2nd at the US Open.

Mixed doubles

 Billie Jean King /  Owen Davidson defeated  Betty Stöve /  Robert Maud, 6–3, 7–5

Seeded players

Men's singles
 John Newcombe (first round, lost to Jan Kodeš)
 Stanley Smith (champion)
 Arthur Ashe (semifinals, lost to Jan Kodeš)
 Tom Okker (semifinals, lost to Stanley Smith)
 Marty Riessen (quarterfinals, lost to Stanley Smith)
 Cliff Richey (third round, lost to Jim Osborne)
 Clark Graebner (quarterfinals, lost to Tom Okker)
 Ilie Năstase (third round, lost to Bob Carmichael)

Prize money

References

External links
Official US Open website

 
 

 
Us Open
US Open
1971
US Open (tennis)
US Open (tennis)